Crossroads is a 1988 music collection box set of the work of Eric Clapton released by Polydor Records. The set includes his work with the Yardbirds, John Mayall & the Bluesbreakers, Cream, Blind Faith, Delaney & Bonnie & Friends and Derek and the Dominos, as well as his solo career.

Several live or alternative studio recordings were previously unreleased. Anthony DeCurtis contributed the liner notes to the album, and The Rolling Stones guitarist Ronnie Wood painted the album's cover. Mitchell Kanner designed the package and, along with Michael Bays, art directed the package. Crossroads was mastered by Greg Calbi and compiled by Bill Levenson. The four-disc box set sold more than four million copies worldwide and was presented with six awards, including two Grammy Awards awarded in 1989. With high commercial success and positive critical response, this is Clapton's most-purchased box set to date.

Critical reception

The critics for Billboard magazine noted mostly the production work, besides the compilations track listing stating: "Compiler Levenson has unearthed some superb rarities for the set, and Anthony DeCurtis contributes intelligent annotation. Classy package and bounty of unheard material will attract Slowhand's legion of fans". Rolling Stone journalist David Fricke really liked the boxed set and awarded the release an extremely rare five-star rating in April 1988. In his review for the American music website AllMusic, critic Stephen Thomas Erlewine presented the album with five out of five possible stars, rating the release as an AllMusic top album and notes:

Awards

Track listings

CD release

Vinyl release

Personnel

From Polydor's 1988 4 Compaq Disc Edition liner notes (835 261-2)

Disc One

Keith Relf - vocals (1-8), harmonica (1-7)
Eric Clapton - guitar, vocals (14,16,17,19-22)
Chris Dreja - guitar (1-9)
Paul Samwell-Smith - bass (1-9)
Jim McCarty - drums (1-9)
Brian Auger - harpsichord (8)
Denny Piercey - bongos (8)
John Mayall - vocals (10,13,15), harmonica (10), piano (11,14), organ (12,13,15)
John McVie - bass (12-14)
Hughie Flint - drums (12-15)
Jack Bruce - bass (15-23), vocals (16-18,20-22), piano (16,17)
Ginger Baker - drums (16-23), vocals (16,17)

Disc Two

Eric Clapton - vocals (1,3,4,9-17), guitar (1-7,9-17), lead guitar (8)
Jack Bruce - bass (1-4), vocals (2)
Ginger Baker - drums (1-7), percussion (1), tympani (2)
Felix Pappalardi - viola (1,2), mellotron (1,4), piano (4)
George Harrison - guitar (4,13), vocals (13)
Steve Winwood - vocals (5-7), piano (5,7), bass (5), guitar (6)
Rick Grech - bass (6,7)
Delaney Bramlett - vocals (8-11), guitar (8-11)
Bonnie Bramlett - vocals (8-11)
Dave Mason - guitar (8,13), vocals (13)
Bobby Whitlock - keyboards (8,9), organ (10,11,14), guitar (12), vocals (12-14), piano (13,14,16,17)
Carl Radle - bass (8-14,16,17)
Jim Gordon - drums (8-14,16,17), piano (14)
Jim Price - trumpet (8-11)
Bobby Keys - sax (8-11)
Tex Johnson - percussion (8)
Rita Coolidge - vocals (8-11)
Leon Russell - piano (9-11)
Sonny Curtis - vocals (9-11)
Jerry Allison - vocals (9-11)
Stephen Stills - guitar (11), vocals (11)
Duane Allman - guitar (14,15)

Disc Three

Eric Clapton - vocals (1-4,6-16), guitar, dobro (6)
Carl Radle - bass
Jim Gordon - drums (1-5)
Bobby Whitlock - piano (2-5)
George Terry - guitar (6,8-16), vocals (6)
Dick Sims - organ (6-11,13-16), piano (12)
Albhy Galuten - piano (6,8), ARP synthesizer (6)
Jamie Oldaker - drums (6-16)
Yvonne Elliman - vocals (6,7,9,13-16)
Tom Bernfeld - vocals (6)
Dave Mason - guitar (7)
Marcy Levy - vocals (9,14-16), tambourine (9)
Peter Tosh - vocals (14), guitar (14)

Disc Four

Eric Clapton - vocals, guitar, dobro (2)
George Terry - guitar (1-8)
Jesse Ed Davis - guitar (1,2)
Dick Sims - keyboards (1-8)
Carl Radle - bass (1-8)
Jamie Oldaker - drums (1-8,12,13)
Yvonne Elliman - vocals (1,3-6)
Marcy Levi - vocals (1,3-8,12,13)
Sergio Pastora Rodriguez - percussion (1-3)
Bob Dylan - vocals (2)
Robbie Robertson - guitar (2)
Ron Wood - guitar (2)
Albert Lee - guitar (9-11), keyboards (11), vocals (11)
Chris Stainton - keyboards (9,10,12,14), synthesizer and Hammond organ (13)
Dave Markee - bass (9,10)
Henry Spinetti - drums (9,10)
Gary Brooker - keyboards (10)
Ry Cooder - guitar (11)
Donald "Duck" Dunn - bass (11-14)
Roger Hawkins - drums (11)
John Sambataro - vocals (11)
Chuck Kirkpatrick - vocals (11)
Peter Robinson - synthesizer (12,13)
Phil Collins - percussion (12,15,16), Simmons and snare drums (13), drums (14-16), vocals (15,16)
Ray Cooper - percussion (12,13)
Shaun Murphy - vocals (12,13)
Greg Phillinganes - keyboards (15,16), vocals (15,16)
Nathan East - bass (15-17), vocals (17)
Michael Brecker - sax (15)
Jon Faddis - trumpet (15)
Randy Brecker - trumpet (15)
Dave Bargeron - trombone (15)
Katie Kissoon - vocals (16)
Tessa Niles - vocals (16)
Alan Clark - keyboards (17)
Andy Newmark - drums (17)

Commercial success
Crossroads is Clapton's commercially most successful multi-disc boxed set, charting in both 1988 and 1989, selling a total of more than three million copies worldwide. In the United States, the 1988 box set was most successful. It peaked at number eight on Billboard magazines Top Pop Compact Disks chart in May 1988 and entered the magazines Top 200 albums chart at position 80. At that point, Clapton was the second artist ever to chart in the Top 100 field with a box set containing six discs, following Elvis Presley. In its first week on chart, Crossroads was both the best- and fastest-selling box set, ever to be released, selling more than 240,000 copies in the first few weeks after its release in the United States. At that point, more than 120,000 copies which were sold were on CD formats, which was still quite rare at the time. In 1988, the release topped the Top Pop Compact Disks chart and reached number 34 on the Billboard 200 top albums chart, where Crossroads stayed a total of 26 weeks on chart. In 2005, the compilation album was certified with a triple Platinum award by the Recording Industry Association of America (RIAA), commemorating the sale of more than three million copies in the United States alone, making it Clapton's best-selling box set in the country. In 1988, the Clapton record was the 26th most-purchased Pop music CD in the United States. In Europe, the box set was a medium success, reaching the Top 20 in only two countries. In the Netherlands, the box set reached number 17 and stayed a total of nine weeks in the charts. Crossroads also reached number 25 on the worldwide albums chart in 1988.

Chart positions

Weekly charts

Year-end charts

Certifications

References

1988 compilation albums
Albums produced by Tom Dowd
Eric Clapton compilation albums
Polydor Records compilation albums
Pop rock compilation albums
Psychedelic rock compilation albums
Rock compilation albums